Deep is the third solo studio album by English musician Peter Murphy. Produced by Simon Rogers, the album was released on 19 December 1989 through Beggars Banquet Records in the UK and RCA/Atlantic Records in the US. The album features contributions from Murphy's backing band, The Hundred Men.

The album spawned three singles: "The Line Between the Devil's Teeth (And That Which Cannot Be Repeat)", "Cuts You Up" and "A Strange Kind of Love". The track "Cuts You Up" became a modern rock hit in 1990, spending seven weeks at the top of the U.S. charts and crossing over to Billboard Hot 100, where it peaked at number 55. The other singles also charted on the Modern Rock Tracks chart, peaking at numbers 18 and 21, respectively.

Critical reception 

Ned Raggett of AllMusic praised the album, stating that "Deep showed Murphy balancing mass appeal and his own distinct art with perfection," and also wrote that "Murphy simply sounds like he's having the time of his life, singing both for the sheer joy of it and for the dramatic power of his commanding voice."

Track listing

Personnel 
 Peter Murphy – vocals, lyrics, mixing, design

The Hundred Men
 Terl Bryant – drums, percussion
 Eddie Branch – bass
 Paul Statham – guitar, keyboards
 Peter Bonas – guitar

Other musicians
 Gill Tingay – harp 
 Jim Williams – guitar 

Technical personnel
 Simon Rogers – production, acoustic guitar; mixing 
 Ian Grimble – engineering
 Steve Rooke – mastering
 Nick Rogers – mixing 
 Paul Cox – photography
 Alastair Johnson – recording
 Roland Herrington – recording

Charts

Weekly charts

Singles

References

External links 
 

Peter Murphy (musician) albums
1989 albums
Beggars Banquet Records albums
RCA Records albums
Albums recorded at Rockfield Studios